Abdo Hussameddin (born 1954) is a Syrian politician and former government minister. He was aide to the oil minister from August 2009 to 7 March 2012, when he became the highest-ranking government minister to defect to the opposition from Bashar al-Assad's government.

Life
After studying petroleum engineering at university, Abdo Hussameddin worked as a drilling engineer for the state-owned Syrian Oil Company. Rising through the oil and gas industry in Syria, he was appointed general manager of the State Establishment for Oil Refining in March 2009. He was appointed aide to the Oil Minister in Syria in August 2009. On 7 March 2012 he resigned his ministerial post to join the opposition to Bashar al-Assad's government, announcing his decision in a video posted on YouTube:

Abdo Hussameddin is married with four children.

References

1954 births
Living people
Oil and mineral reserves ministers of Syria
People of the Syrian civil war
Arab Socialist Ba'ath Party – Syria Region politicians
Syrian defectors